Eduardo René Valenzuela Becker (born April 20, 1955), known as René Valenzuela, is a Chilean former footballer who played as a defender.

Career
Valenzuela represented his native country at the 1982 FIFA World Cup, wearing the number three jersey. He played for several clubs in Chile, including Universidad Católica. For Chile he played 46 matches between 1979 and 1985.

Following his retirement, he has worked as coach at youth level in academies such as Universidad Catolica Academy in Rancagua.

Honours
Universidad Católica
 Chilean Primera División: 1984
 Copa Polla Gol: 1983
 Copa República: 1983

Unión Española
 : 1989

References

External links
 
 René Valenzuela at Weltfussball  
 

1955 births
Living people
Sportspeople from Concepción, Chile
Chilean footballers
Chilean expatriate footballers
Chile international footballers
Chilean Primera División players
Liga MX players
Deportes Concepción (Chile) footballers
O'Higgins F.C. footballers
Club Deportivo Universidad Católica footballers
Unión Española footballers
Association football defenders
1979 Copa América players
1982 FIFA World Cup players
1983 Copa América players
Chilean expatriate sportspeople in Mexico
Expatriate footballers in Mexico
Chilean football managers